Yellow-weed is a common name for several plants and may refer to:

Ranunculus bulbosus, native to western Europe
Reseda luteola, native to Europe and western Asia
Solidago canadensis, native to North America